Portello (also known as Portino and Ruby Mello) is a carbonated grape and berry flavored soft drink. Its rich, fruity flavour can be compared to port wine (which inspired the drink's name) or cola. It is believed to have originated in London, England in the 18th century, before spreading to colonies of the British Empire.

Distribution
In Australia, portello has been manufactured since the late 19th century. Varieties are currently produced by Kirks, Billson's, Diet Rite (from Tru Blu Beverages), River Port, Woodroofe, Trend Drinks, Nippy's, Hartz, Crows Nest Soft Drink, Saxbys Soft Drinks and Wimmers Soft Drinks.

A grape flavoured soft drink named Portello was manufactured by Jubilee Ice and Soda Works in Uganda in the late 1940s. It was said to be more popular in Busoga than drinks produced by Coca-Cola and Pepsi. 

"Fanta Portello" is currently sold by The Coca-Cola Company in Sri Lanka. 

A similar, however unrelated drink named "Portello" was developed in northern Sweden in the 1920s by Malmbergets brewery.

See also
 Cream soda

External links 
 Portello on Swedish Wikipedia

References

British soft drinks
Fruit sodas
Non-alcoholic drinks